Jane Maguire (born 18 February 2003) is an Irish cricketer who plays for Scorchers and Ireland.

In October 2020, Maguire was named in Ireland's squad to play Scotland at the La Manga Club during their tour of Spain. However, the matches were called off due to the COVID-19 pandemic. In May 2021, Maguire was again named in Ireland's squad to face Scotland, this time for a four-match Women's Twenty20 International (WT20I) series in Belfast. In September 2021, Maguire was named in Ireland's Women's One Day International (WODI) squad for their series against Zimbabwe, the first WODI matches to be played by the Zimbabwe team. She made her WODI debut on 7 October 2021, for Ireland against Zimbabwe.

In November 2021, she was named in Ireland's team for the 2021 Women's Cricket World Cup Qualifier tournament in Zimbabwe. In May 2022, Maguire was named in Ireland's Women's Twenty20 International (WT20I) squad for their series against South Africa. She made her WT20I debut on 3 June 2022, for Ireland against South Africa.

References

External links

 

2003 births
Living people
Cricketers from Dublin (city)
Irish women cricketers
Ireland women One Day International cricketers
Ireland women Twenty20 International cricketers
Scorchers (women's cricket) cricketers
Dragons (women's cricket) cricketers
Typhoons (women's cricket) cricketers